Han Soo-yeon ( born April 24, 1983) is a South Korean actress best known for her roles in Korean dramas, Pure Love (2013) and Love in the Moonlight (2016).

Early life and education
Han was born in South Korea, and moved with her mother and sister to Budapest, Hungary in 1990, where her mother studied classical singing at the Franz Liszt Academy of Music. She began primary school in Budapest and learned to speak Hungarian fluently. The family moved back to South Korea in 1998. She then studied at Sungkyunkwan University, and after graduation appeared in television commercials, dramas and films.

Career
Han's first major role was in Our Fantastic 21st Century (너와 나의 21세기, Neowa naui 21 segi), an independent film directed by Ryu Hyeong-ki. She became known for her role in daily drama, Pure Love (일말의 순정, Ilmarui sunjeong), which ran from February to August 2013, on KBS2.

Filmography

Film

Television

Web series

Television shows

Ambassadorship 
Consult the Department of Veterans Affairs and Veterans Affairs policy (2022)

References

External links
 
 

1983 births
Living people
21st-century South Korean actresses
South Korean film actresses
South Korean television actresses
TS Entertainment artists